Hastings—Lennox and Addington is a federal electoral district in Ontario.

Hastings—Lennox and Addington was created by the 2012 federal electoral boundaries redistribution and was legally defined in the 2013 representation order. It came into effect upon the call of the 2015 Canadian federal election, scheduled for 19 October 2015. It was created out of parts of Prince Edward—Hastings and Lanark—Frontenac—Lennox and Addington.

Demographics
According to the Canada 2011 Census; 2013 representation

Ethnic groups: 91.9% White, 6.8% Aboriginal 
Languages: 95.3% English, 1.6% French
Religions: 72.5% Christian (20.8% United Church, 20.4% Catholic, 12.2% Anglican, 2.9% Pentecostal, 2.6% Presbyterian, 1.5% Baptist, 12.1% Other), 26.6% No religion 
Median income (2010): $27,448 
Average income (2010): $34,241

Members of Parliament
This riding has elected the following Members of Parliament:

Election results

References

Belleville, Ontario
Ontario federal electoral districts